Nobuhisa (written: 信久, 信尚, 信寿, 暢久, 修久 or 延尚) is a masculine Japanese given name. Notable people with the name include:

, Japanese footballer
, Japanese astronomer
, Japanese kugyō
, Japanese daimyō
, Japanese footballer
, Japanese footballer

Japanese masculine given names